Milam is the last village situated in Johar valley of Pithoragarh district in the state of Uttarakhand, India. The river Gori Ganga originates from Milam Glacier and flows past the village to meet with Kali ganga at Jauljibi.

Historical trade with Tibet 
Milam is on a route over high mountain passes (Unta Dhura, Jandi Dhura and Kingribingri Dhura) to Gyanima mandi in Tibet. The border is closed since the Sino-Indian War of 1962, and Milam is now a ghost village with very few inhabitants. Before the war, it used to be a trade center bustling with 500 families. As of now all trade with Tibet is stopped and the families have settled in Munsiyari and other places in the lower ranges. In summer months very few people go there and cultivate medicinal plants, high altitude Buckwheat and Jambhu. Tibetan merchants visited this place and traded in Borax, precious stones, Pashmina and salt. The inhabitants of Milam too travelled along with pack mules to Tibet. They took rice, cotton clothes, jaggery, sugar, etc. to sell in Tibetan markets. The famous pandit-explorers Nain Singh and Kishan Singh who mapped Tibet territory belong to this village.

Trekking 
The trek to Milam village starts from Munsiyari a road head that can be reached from Almora or Pithoragarh. The trek passes through Lilam, Bogudiar, Rilkot, Martoli, Burfu and Bilju. Prominent peaks situated above the glacier are Hardeol, Trisuli, Nanda Ghoonti etc. Some of the camping places above the glacier are Nitwal dhar, Suraj kund etc. Nandadevi East base camp can be reached through a side valley from Ghangar and Pacchu villages. The ideal trekking period is from May to October excluding monsoon months. However, as the inhabitants of the upper villages tend to move down the valley for the winter months trekkers may find that food and accommodation is not available especially after the festival of Diwali.

Prominent people
 Krishna Singh Rawat (1850-1921), honorary titled as Rai Bahadur by British raj, was an Indian explorer and cartographer. He was first to map the Ramgarh crater on a finer scale of (1 : 63,360).
 Nain Singh Rawat, honorary titled as C.I.E by British raj, was an Indian explorer, he was the cousin of the explorer Krishna Singh Rawat. He would later say that Thok Jalung was the coldest place he had ever visited.

See also
 Kalapani, Uttarakhand

References

Villages in Pithoragarh district